Qaidan or Qayedan may refer to:
 Qaidan, Chaharmahal and Bakhtiari
 Qaidan, Markazi